Joe Patterson is an American politician currently serving as a Republican member of the California State Assembly from the 5th district. Elected in 2022, he assumed office on December 5, 2022. Patterson previously served on the Rocklin City Council from 2016 to 2022, serving as the city's mayor in 2019.

Early life and education
Patterson was born in Napa, California. He earned a Bachelor of Arts (BA) in Government from California State University, Sacramento. He was admitted to the post-graduate Jesse M. Unruh Assembly Fellowship where he began working in the State Legislature.

Career
Patterson was elected to the Rocklin City Council in November 2016. In December 2018, he was appointed by the city's council as the city's mayor for 2019. He was re-elected as a councilmember in November 2020. Patterson has been the executive director of the California Gaming Association, treasurer for the Rocklin Public Safety Foundation and a member of the Rocklin Area Chamber of Commerce.

In January 2022, Patterson announced his campaign for the 5th Assembly District to replace retiring Assembly member Frank Bigelow. He placed second in June nonpartisan blanket primary. Patterson resigned from the Rocklin City Council in June in order focus on his campaign for the State Assembly. He won the November general election against Democrat Rebecca Chenoweth and took office on December 5, 2022.

Personal life
Patterson lives in the Whitney Ranch area of Rocklin with his wife Colleen and their four children.

Election results

2022

References

External links

Republican Party members of the California State Assembly
Living people
21st-century American politicians
California State University, Sacramento alumni
Year of birth missing (living people)